Az-Zawiya  (also spelled Zawiyeh) is a Palestinian village in the Jenin Governorate in the northern West Bank, located south of Jenin. According to the Palestinian Central Bureau of Statistics (PCBS) census, the village had a population of 770 in 2007.

History
Pottery sherds from Early Bronze Age I and II, Iron Age II, Persian, Hellenistic and early Roman have been found here.

Tombs and a  columbarium have been cut into the rock, and ceramics from the Byzantine era have also been found here, as have sherds from early Muslim and Medieval eras.

Ottoman era
In 1517, Zawiya was incorporated into the Ottoman Empire with the rest of Palestine. In 1596, it appeared in Ottoman tax registers as a village named Zawiyat, or alternatively Sayh Mohammad Rifa'i,  in the nahiya (subdistrict) of Jabal Sami in the Nablus Sanjak. It had a population of 12 households, all Muslim.

In 1870,  Victor Guérin described as having a small number of houses, situated on a mound.

In 1882, the  PEF's  Survey of Western Palestine described it as: "A hamlet on a hill side, with a  well  to the west. It seems to take its name from the sudden twist in the road near the place."

British Mandate era
In the 1922 census of Palestine conducted by the British Mandate authorities, Zawieh had a population 45 Muslims, increasing  in the 1931 census to 76 Muslim, in  a total of 17 houses.

In   1945 statistics   the population was 120  Muslims, with 1,066 dunams of land, according to an official land and population survey.  Of this, 310  dunams were used for cereals, while  4 dunams were built-up, urban land.

Jordanian era
Following the 1948 Arab–Israeli War, and the subsequent 1949 Armistice Agreements, Zawiya came under Jordanian rule.

In 1961, the population of Zawiya was  152.

Israeli occupation
Since the Six-Day War in 1967,  Zawiya   has been under Israeli occupation, and according to the Israeli census of that year, the population of Zawiya stood at 239, of whom 13 were registered as having come  from Israel.

On Saturday 9 January 2016 the owner of a local trading company, Said Abu Al-Wafa (35), was shot dead by Israeli soldiers at the Beka'ot roadblock.

References

Bibliography

External links
Welcome To Zawiya
 Zawiya, Welcome to Palestine
Survey of Western Palestine, Map 11: IAA, Wikimedia commons 

Villages in the West Bank
Jenin Governorate
Municipalities of the State of Palestine